Glenn Jones (born October 1, 1953) is an American guitarist, He is most recognized for his work in the experimental rock group Cul de Sac.

History 
At age 14, Jones picked up playing the acoustic guitar, which he purchased after hearing Axis: Bold as Love. During the early seventies, Jones discovered American primitive guitar and became influenced by Robbie Basho and John Fahey. It wasn't until he was asked by Robin Amos to join Shut-Up that he began playing an electric guitar. In 1989, he founded Cul de Sac with Amos in Boston, Massachusetts.

Discography 
 This Is the Wind That Blows It Out: Solos for 6 & 12 String Guitar (Strange Attractors, 2004)
 Against Which the Sea Continually Beats (Strange Attractors, 2007)
 Barbecue Bob in Fishtown (Strange Attractors, 2009)
 Even to Win is to Fail (split with 'Eastmont Syrup' by The Black Twig Pickers & Charlie Parr, Thrill Jockey, 2011) 
 The Wanting (Thrill Jockey, 2011)
 My Garden State (Thrill Jockey, 2013)
 Welcomed Wherever I Go (Thrill Jockey, 2014) 
 Fleeting (Thrill Jockey, 2016)
 The Giant Who Ate Himself and Other New Works for 6 & 12 String Guitar (Thrill Jockey, 2018)

References

1953 births
American folk guitarists
American male guitarists
Cul de Sac (band) members
Place of birth missing (living people)
Fingerstyle guitarists
Guitarists from Massachusetts
People from Montgomery County, Maryland
Living people
20th-century American guitarists
20th-century American male musicians